Journal of General Virology is a not-for-profit peer-reviewed scientific journal published by the Microbiology Society. The journal was established in 1967 and covers research into animal viruses, insect viruses, plants viruses, fungal viruses, prokaryotic viruses, and TSE agents. Antiviral compounds and clinical aspects of virus infection are also covered.

Since 2020 the editor-in-chief is Paul Duprex (Centre for Vaccine Research, University of Pittsburgh), who took over from Professor Mark Harris (University of Leeds) who had served as Editor-in-Chief since 2015.

Journal

Article types 
Journal of General Virology publishes primary research articles, Reviews, Short Communications, Personal Views, and Editorials. 

Since 2017 the journal has partnered with the International Committee on Taxonomy of Viruses to publish Open Access ICTV Virus Taxonomy Profiles which summarise chapters of the ICTV’s 10th Report on Virus Taxonomy. All ICTV Virus Taxonomy Profiles are published under a Creative Commons Attribution license (CC-BY).

Metrics 
The Microbiology Society journals are a signatory to DORA (the San Francisco Declaration on Research Assessment) and use a range of Article-Level Metrics (ALMs) as well as a range of journal-level metrics to assess quality and impact. An Altmetric score and Dimensions citation data are available for all articles published by the Microbiology Society journals.

Abstracting and indexing 
Journal of General Virology is indexed in Biological Abstracts, BIOSIS Previews, CAB Abstracts, Chemical Abstracts Service, Current Awareness in Biological Sciences, Current Contents– Life Sciences, Current Opinion series, EMBASE, MEDLINE/Index Medicus/PubMed, Russian Academy of Science, Science Citation Index, SciSearch, SCOPUS, and on Google Scholar.

Open access policy 
Journal of General Virology is a hybrid title and allows authors to publish subscription articles free-of-charge. Authors can also publish Open Access articles under a Creative Commons Attribution license (CC-BY) by either paying an article processing charge (APC) or fee-free as part of a Publish and Read model.

References

External links 

 

Delayed open access journals
Publications established in 1967
English-language journals
Monthly journals
Virology journals
Microbiology Society academic journals